Mäki-Matti is a district and a statistical area of Jyväskylä, Finland and a part of the Kantakaupunki ward. The statistical area contains the Nousukatu, Hippos, Rautpohja, Kyllö and Syrjälä subareas. Mäki-Matti has several services such as schools, a convenience store, a pub and a R-Kioski shop. The oldest family park of Finland is also located in the district.

Mäki-Matti is the first suburb of Jyväskylä to be merged into the city, which was done in 1914.

History 
Mäki-Matti is named after a tenant farmer named Matti Matinpoika (fl. 1806-1865), whose tenure farm Paatela was split from the Syrjälä farm. The name Paatela disappears from church documents in the 1840s and is replaced by the name Mäki-Matti. Originally Mäki-Matti was only a farm name while the area was simply known as Mäki, "the hill". The name of the area appears as Mäkimatin mäki in church documents from the year 1881. The term, pronounced as MäkʹMatti (where kʹ represents a palatalized /k/) in the local dialect, was later extended to the entire Syrjälä area.

Osuuskauppa Mäki-Matti was founded in 1905. It was one of the first cooperative shops in Finland. Mäki-Matti was transferred from Jyväskylän maalaiskunta to Jyväskylä in 1908.

Gallery

Notable people 

 Gettomasa, rapper
 Matti Nykänen, ski jumper
Väinö Voionmaa, politician

References 

Neighbourhoods of Jyväskylä